Karl Ludwig Alexander Schuke (6 November 1906 – 7 May 1987) was a German organ builder. The son of the organ builder Alexander Schuke, he continued, together with his brother Hans-Joachim Schuke, to run their father's company in Potsdam until 1953, when he founded another organ building company, the Karl Schuke Berliner Orgelbauwerkstatt in West Berlin. They have built organs internationally in Korea, Australia and the U.S.

Life 
He then began an apprenticeship as an organ builder in his father's workshop. From 1924, he received special training in metal pipe making. He established a workshop for pipe making, including training of workers. From 1927, he constructed pneumatic and electric action and  systems.

When their father died in 1933, Karl and his brother Hans-Joachim continued to run the business together. Karl was responsible for technical issues, while Hans-Joachim was responsible for commercial aspects. Despite war-related restrictions after 1939, the business continued to exist exclusively through organ building and repairs.

Hans-Joachim Schuke returned from Soviet captivity in 1948. Potsdam belonged to the East German zone. In 1953, Schuke moved to Berlin and began to build up the workshop in Berlin-Lichterfelde, while his brother kept running the Potsdam workshop. The company built the organ for the new Kaiser Wilhelm Memorial Church in 1962/63. They built the main organ of the Berliner Philharmonie in 1965, and renovated it in 1992, 2012 and 2016.

In 1966, the workshop was moved to Berlin-Zehlendorf. Schuke retired in 1976, succeeded by Wolfgang Theer. The company built a new instrument for the Sejong Center in Seoul in 1978.

In 1955, Schuke received a teaching assignment for organ studies at the Musikhochschule Berlin in Berlin, and in 1956 he was appointed to the state examination board for church musicians. In 1962, he was appointed professor at the Musikhochschule, and from 1966, he was honorary professor. In 1967, he was elected to the board of directors of the "Bund deutscher Orgelbaumeister", an association of German organ builders.

Schuke died in Berlin in 1987 at the age of 80. His grave is located at the Waldfriedhof Zehlendorf.

Awards 
 1972: Order of Merit of the Federal Republic of Germany

References

Further reading 
 Martin Balz: Zum 100. Geburtstag von Karl Schuke. In Ars Organi 4/2006, pp. 256f.

External links 

 Company and family history Karl Schuke Berliner Orgelbauwerkstatt
 Schuke, Karl Ludwig on BMLO

 

German pipe organ builders
Officers Crosses of the Order of Merit of the Federal Republic of Germany
Academic staff of the Berlin University of the Arts
1906 births
1987 deaths
People from Potsdam
20th-century German people